Elections to the French National Assembly were held in Morocco on 2 June 1946 as part of wider French elections.

Results

References

Morocco
Morocco
1946
1946 in Morocco